The Lycée Georges Clemenceau, usually called Lycée Clemenceau is a public secondary school located in Nantes, France, formerly known as the Lycée of Nantes. Inaugurated in 1808, it is the oldest secondary school of the town of Nantes and in the department of Loire-Atlantique.

It offers both a sixth-form college curriculum (as a lycée), and a post-secondary-level curriculum (classes préparatoires).

It is located next to a botanic garden (Jardin des plantes). Train and tram stations offer an easy access to the school for students. Furthermore there is a lovely chapel inside.

The Emperor Napoleon visited the Lycée on 9 August 1808. The school was rebuilt from 1886 to 1892 to a design by the architects  Antoine Demoget and Léon Lenoir. Many famous people studied in Clemenceau, like the writer Jules Verne and the politician Georges Clemenceau who give his name to the school.

Famous Alumni

Writers
 Henri Anger (1907–1989), novelist
 Rene Guy Cadou (1920-1951, poet)
 Alphonse de Châteaubriant (1877-1951)
 Edmond Coarer-Kalondan (1909-1981)
 Tristan Corbière (1845-1865, poet)
 Marc Elder (1884-1933)
 Julien Gracq (1910-2007)
 Morvan Lebesque (1911-1970, also journalist)
 Jean Sarment (1897-1976, also actor)
 Marcel Schwob (1867-1905)
 Jules Verne (1828-1905)
 Jacques Vaché (1895-1919)
 Jules Vallès (1832-1885)

Politicians
 Yed Angoran, minister of the industry from Ivory Coast
 François Autain, senator and Secretary of State
 Louis Mathurin Babin-Chevaye, industrial and deputy
 Jean Babin-Chevaye, industrial and senator
 Robert Badinter, lawyer, minister of Justice, president of the Constitutional Council
 Mehdi Bazargan, 46th Prime Minister of Iran (1979)
 Paul Bellamy, deputy-mayor of Nantes
 Aristide Briand, minister, president of the Council (prime minister) and Nobel Peace Prize
 Georges Clemenceau, journalist, senator and president of the Council (prime minister)
 Henri Lopès, prime minister of the Republic of the Congo
 André Morice, minister, parliamentary and mayor of Nantes
 Abdollah Riazi, 16th Speaker of the Parliament of Iran (1963–1978)
 Jacques Sourdille, medicine professor and Secretary of State.

Painters 
 Maurice Chabas
 Paul Chabas
 Jules Grandjouan (engaged dessinator)
 Emile Laboureur
 Amédée Dubois de La Patellière
 Maxime Maufra
 Jean Metzinger
 James Tissot

Musicians, dancers, cineastes and actors 
 The brothers André et Georges Bellec (singers from the group les Frères Jacques)
 Yvan Dautin (singer)
 Jacques Garnier (dancer and choreograph)
 Jacques Grand-Jouan (cineaste)
 Thierry Fortineau (actor)
 Paul Ladmirault (compositor)
 Yves Lecoq (actor)
 Jacques Legras (actor)
 Olivier Messiaen
 François Tusques (compositor)
 François Verret (choreograph)
 Christine and the Queens (musician)

Industrial and engineer 
 Louis Amieux
 Ernest Cassegrain
 Thomas Dobrée (shipowner)
 Eugène Dubigeon (engineer)
 Léon Jost (industrial)
 Louis Lefèvre-Utile (industrial)
 Alphonse Lotz-Brissonneau (engineer)
 Arsène Saupiquet
 Constant Say
 Georges Evano (architect)
 Pol Abraham (architect)

Doctors 
 Félix Guyon (surgeon)
 Gustave Rappin (doctor)

Military 
 General Boulanger
 General Buat
 General Huntziger
 General Lamoricière

Further reading

Books 
Jean Guiffan, Joël Barreau and Jean-Louis Liters dir., Le Lycée Clemenceau. 200 ans d'histoire ; Nantes, éditions Coiffard, 2008. 
Jean Guiffan, Le Péché de Nantes. L'abbé Follioley, dernier proviseur ecclésiastique (1890-1898), Éditions du Petit Véhicule, Nantes, 1998. Réédition, Le Dernier Prêtre-proviseur (1890-1898). "Le Péché de Nantes", 2007.

References

External links 
 official site of the lycée Clemenceau

Educational institutions established in 1808
1808 establishments in France
Lycées in Nantes